Antonio Jesús García González (born 24 February 1977), known as Toñito, is a Spanish former footballer who played mainly as an attacking midfielder.

He spent most of his professional career in Portugal where he represented five clubs (mainly Sporting), amassing Primeira Liga totals of 207 games and 24 goals.

Club career
Toñito was born in La Orotava, Tenerife. A player with skill and teamwork approach alike, he started playing professionally with hometown club CD Tenerife. After having made no appearances for the first team, he moved to Portugal for the 1997–98 season and joined Vitória de Setúbal, going on to represent in the country Sporting CP, C.D. Santa Clara – loaned, where he joined Mauricio Hanuch, also on loan– and Boavista FC; he played an important part in Sporting's conquest of the 2000 Primeira Liga championship, their first in 18 years, playing 28 games although 25 of those were as a substitute.

In the 2005–06 campaign, Toñito returned to Spain and Tenerife, with the club now in the second division, scoring seven league goals including two in a 3–2 away win against Racing de Ferrol on 27 May 2006, before he was stretchered off. After a quick spell in Croatia with HNK Rijeka he returned to Portugal, netting a late equaliser for U.D. Leiria at former side Sporting (1–1 in Lisbon), although his team would eventually drop down a level.

For 2008–09, Toñito moved to Greece's Ionikos FC. However, in January 2009, he switched to Cyprus and AEK Larnaca FC, reuniting with former Sporting teammate Elpídio Silva; he retired from the game at the end of the season, aged 32.

Honours
Sporting 
Primeira Liga: 1999–2000
Supertaça Cândido de Oliveira: 2000, 2002

References

External links

1977 births
Living people
People from Tenerife
Sportspeople from the Province of Santa Cruz de Tenerife
Spanish footballers
Footballers from the Canary Islands
Association football midfielders
Segunda División players
Segunda División B players
Tercera División players
CD Tenerife B players
CD Tenerife players
Primeira Liga players
Vitória F.C. players
Sporting CP footballers
C.D. Santa Clara players
Sporting CP B players
Boavista F.C. players
U.D. Leiria players
Croatian Football League players
HNK Rijeka players
Ionikos F.C. players
Cypriot First Division players
AEK Larnaca FC players
Spanish expatriate footballers
Expatriate footballers in Portugal
Expatriate footballers in Croatia
Expatriate footballers in Greece
Expatriate footballers in Cyprus
Spanish expatriate sportspeople in Portugal
Spanish expatriate sportspeople in Croatia
Spanish expatriate sportspeople in Greece
Spanish expatriate sportspeople in Cyprus